Gazyan is a village in the Qubadli District of Azerbaijan.

History 
The village was located in the Armenian-occupied territories surrounding Nagorno-Karabakh, coming under the control of ethnic Armenian forces during the First Nagorno-Karabakh War in the early 1990s. The village subsequently became part of the breakaway Republic of Artsakh as part of its Kashatagh Province, where it was known as Haykazyan. It was recaptured by Azerbaijan on or around November 7, 2020 during the 2020 Nagorno-Karabakh war.

Historical heritage sites 
Historical heritage sites in and around the village include the bridge of Lalazar, built in 1868.

Demographics 
There were 22 families with a total population of 74 in the community of Haykazyan in 2015.

Notable people 
 Aliyar Aliyev — National Hero of Azerbaijan.

Gallery

References

External links 
 

Populated places in Qubadli District